The Tube Music Network, Inc., or The Tube, was an American digital multicast television network. The network was a fully owned subsidiary of The Tube Media Corp., an independent company that was founded by David Levy in 2003. The Tube focused classic and modern music videos in a format similar to the original format of cable networks MTV and VH1, prior to those networks' shift towards long-form entertainment programming. The network also aired occasional commercials and public service announcements, as well as three hours of educational and informational programming (as mandated by the Federal Communications Commission) on Saturday mornings.

The network's president and founder was Les Garland, a veteran of MTV and VH1. The ad split was 6 minutes per for the network and 1 minute to the station. The network was not sold any of the national ad time. The Tube planned to attract a wider audience than MTV and other music channels by playing music regardless of genre or decade. 700 videos would be available to play with 14 videos per hours. Additional programming was made available for the station's main channel. The network's website would be a store as visitors could buy what they see on the network.

History
The Tube Music Network was founded by Les Garland. Raycom Media was an initial round investor in the company. Shane Coppola, formerly of Westwood One, became involved and brought in Pat LaPlatney to head the network in 2005. LaPlatney was frustrated by a difficult capital structure that made it hard to raise additional capital. He end up working six or eight months for no salary. LaPlatney quit by August 2007 to work for Raycom Media, which was an initial round investor.

The Tube was initially available primarily in markets with stations operated by Raycom Media. In April 2005, Raycom was testing the network on station WFLX-TV, a Fox affiliate, for three weeks. Raycom then announced on April 25, 2005, it was the launch station group for The Tube affiliating 29 stations. Raycom launched the network in June 2005 on 30 stations with Cleveland being the largest market.

According to a March 2006 article in The New York Times, Tribune Broadcasting announced that it would start carrying The Tube on its stations that summer. However, it had already begun to be carried on digital subchannels of Tribune-owned stations in New York City, Los Angeles, Chicago, and Philadelphia. The network was also carried on WLVI in Boston, which was sold by Tribune to Sunbeam Television in late December 2006.

Equity Broadcasting Corporation distributed the network's programming free-to-air on Galaxy 10R Ku-band satellite for carriage by some of the individual low-power televisions that it owned in different U.S. cities.

Sinclair Broadcast Group would sign an affiliation agreement to carry The Tube as well. That relationship ended on January 1, 2007, in a dispute of contractual issues.

The FCC ruled that in addition to the main analog channels, each digital subchannel would also be required to run the government-mandated three hours of educational and informational programming per week, as well as any Emergency Alert System tests and bulletins. The Tube would air the animal-focused music program Wildlife Jams to meet the E/I requirements. The rules would later be changed, requiring the main channel to air more E/I programming in relation to how many subchannels that the station operated and how much "free programming" they offered.

On October 1, 2007 at 6AM, The Tube ceased operations due to "financial limitations"; the final video played was Alabama 3's "Woke Up This Morning", taking advantage of its famed use as the opening theme to the TV series The Sopranos by abruptly cutting to black just as the video ended, just as how the show used the theme. In early 2008, the company had three  separate shareholder class-action lawsuits filed in Florida making financial improprieties claims.

Affiliates

See also
TheCoolTV

References

External links

Defunct television networks in the United States
Lists of American television network affiliates
Music video networks in the United States
Television channels and stations established in 2004
Television channels and stations disestablished in 2007